Batavi is the fourth full-length album by the Dutch pagan / Viking / folk metal band Heidevolk. It was released on March 2, 2012 through Napalm Records. The album's title and album's theme are reference to the Batavi (Germanic tribe).

Batavi is a concept album that deals with the early history of the Batavian tribe: from its beginnings to its daring revolt against one of the greatest empires the world has ever seen. Set against the backdrop of war, alliances, intrigue, and betrayal, the nine songs relate the struggles of a people needing to redefine themselves in order to survive this turbulent time.

Track listing

Personnel
 Joost Vellenknotscher - drums
 Rowan Roodbaert - bass
 Mark Splintervuyscht - vocals
 Reamon Bomenbreker - guitars
 Joris den Boghtdrincker - vocals
 Kevin Vruchtbaert - guitars

Guest musicians
 Irma Vos - violin
 Corinna Tenbuss - flute

Production
 Klaas Lageveen - artwork
 Awik Balaian - artwork
 Nico Van Montfort - engineering
 Jonas Kjellgren - mastering
 Peter Tägtgren - mixing

References

2012 albums
Heidevolk albums
Napalm Records albums